Irena Gillarová (born Irena Šedivá, 19 January 1992) is a Czech athlete specialising in the javelin throw. She won a bronze medal at the 2015 Summer Universiade.

Her personal best in the event is 61.32 metres set in Bydgoszcz in August 2019.

She has studied at Virginia Tech University. Where she has become NCAA Champion in 2015 and 2017. 

In January 2020, she changed her surname due to marriage of her parents.

International competitions

References

1992 births
Living people
Czech female javelin throwers
Czech expatriate sportspeople in the United States
Medalists at the 2015 Summer Universiade
Competitors at the 2017 Summer Universiade
Universiade bronze medalists for the Czech Republic
Universiade medalists in athletics (track and field)
Athletes (track and field) at the 2020 Summer Olympics
Olympic athletes of the Czech Republic
Sportspeople from Příbram